Jonestown was the site of the 1978 mass suicide-and-murder of the Peoples Temple cult in northwestern Guyana.

Jonestown may also refer to:

Other places 
Jonestown, Mahaica, Guyana
Jonestown, Indiana
Jonestown, Baltimore, Maryland
Jonestown, Howard County, Maryland
Jonestown, Coahoma County, Mississippi
Jonestown, Jackson County, Ohio
Jonestown, Van Wert County, Ohio
Jonestown, Columbia County, Pennsylvania
Jonestown, Lebanon County, Pennsylvania
Jonestown, Texas

Music
Jonestown (D-Sisive album) (2009)
Jonestown (Sofia Talvik album) (2008) or its title track
"Jonestown", a composition by Frank Zappa from Boulez Conducts Zappa: The Perfect Stranger

Other uses
Jonestown: The Life and Death of Peoples Temple, a 2006 documentary film
Jonestown: The Power and the Myth of Alan Jones, a 2006 biographical book
Jonestown: Paradise Lost, a 2007 documentary film

See also
Johnstown (disambiguation)
Youngstown
Jones Town (disambiguation)
The Brian Jonestown Massacre